Herbert M. Kopf (June 25, 1901 – March 22, 1996) was an American football player and coach.  He served as the head football coach at Manhattan College from 1938 to 1942 and as the head coach for the Boston Yanks of the National Football League (NFL) from 1944 to 1946.

Playing career
A star baseball player at New Britain High School in New Britain, Connecticut, Kopf switched to football when Washington & Jefferson College dropped its baseball program before his freshman season. A star offensive and defensive end, Kopf was a member of the 10-0 Presidents team that played in the 1922 Rose Bowl, becoming the first freshman ever to play in a Rose Bowl. As a sophomore, Kopf was selected by coach John W. Heisman to call the offensive plays and was a Walter Camp All-America selection.

Coaching career
While attending Georgetown Law School, Kopf was hired as an offensive assistant by Lou Little in 1925. Kopf followed Little to Columbia University in 1930 where he coached the ends and backfield for eight seasons. In 1934, Columbia won the Ivy League championship, finishing the season with a 7–1 record and a 7–0 win in the 1934 Rose Bowl.

Kopf was the head football coach at the Manhattan College from 1938 until the program ended in 1942. His career coaching record at Manhattan was 18–24–1.  This ranks him second at Manhattan in total wins and fifth at Manhattan in winning percentage.

Upon the conclusion of the 1942 season, Manhattan College (like many schools of the day) suspended intercollegiate football games because of World War II. Upon completion of the war, the school decided not to reactivate the program. Kopf was the school's athletic director from 1938 to 1943.

In 1944, Kopf was named head coach of the Boston Yanks. This job was supposed to be temporary until Jim Crowley returned from the Navy.  However, instead of coaching the Yanks, Crowley became commissioner of the new All-America Football Conference and Kopf remained as the Yanks head coach until 1946. In his three seasons with the Yanks, Kopf had a record of 7–22–2. In 1948, Kopf was hired as an assistant under Denny Myers at Boston College. Kopf was not retained by new head coach Mike Holovak in 1951. Kopf's final coaching job was as an assistant to Benny Friedman at Brandeis University.

Later life and death
After coaching, Kopf worked as a paint salesman. He later retired to St. Petersburg, Florida where he died on March 22, 1996.  He had a TV show on Saturday mornings explaining the football game that was going to be shown on TV that day.

Personal life
Kopf was the brother of Larry Kopf, an infielder in the Major Leagues from 1913 to 1923. Kopf served as the Cincinnati Reds on-field messenger during his brother's time there. He was with the Reds during the 1919 World Series, made famous by the Black Sox Scandal.

Head coaching record

College

NFL

References

Additional sources
 

1901 births
1996 deaths
American football ends
Boston College Eagles football coaches
Boston Yanks coaches
Brandeis Judges football coaches
Columbia Lions football coaches
Georgetown Hoyas football coaches
Hartford Blues players
Manhattan Jaspers and Lady Jaspers athletic directors
Manhattan Jaspers football coaches
Washington & Jefferson Presidents football coaches
Washington & Jefferson Presidents football players
People from Winsted, Connecticut
Sportspeople from New Britain, Connecticut
Players of American football from Connecticut
Players of American football from St. Petersburg, Florida